Ornithomya fringillina is a species of fly in the family Hippoboscidae. It is found in the  Palearctic .

References

Hippoboscidae
Insects described in 1836
Muscomorph flies of Europe